Charles Bowen may refer to:

 Charles Bowen, Baron Bowen (1835–1894), English judge
 Charles Bowen (Ontario politician) (1923–1992), mayor of Brantford, 1973–1980
 Charles Bowen (New Zealand politician) (1830–1917), New Zealand politician
 Charles W. Bowen, Master Chief Petty Officer of the Coast Guard
 Chuck Bowen (fl. 1937), American baseball player